Abar Khabo (English: Eat Again) is a sweet originating in West Bengal that consists of two concentric spheres containing pistachios, cashews, raisins and kheer.

History 
Abar khabo was invented by Nobin Chandra Das when requested by the Maharani Swarnamoyee Devi of Cossimbazar to create a new kind of sweet. Upon eating the abar khabo the Maharani exclaimed "আবার খাবো" (Abar Khabo) which became its name.

Kolkata-based sweet shops of the Gupta Brothers and Bhim Chandra Nag are known for making abar khabo.

See also 
 Rasgulla

References 

Sweets of West Bengal